= Assad Thebian =

Lebanese poet

- Born: Lebanon, Beirut
- Occupations: Poet, journalist, Blogger and writer

Assad Thebian (أسعد ذبيان) is a Lebanese poet, journalist, blogger and writer, as well as an expert in public information and in electronic marketing. Assad works in training and consulting in public information and electronic marketing, he also works with numerous civil non-governmental associations and youth initiatives in Lebanon and the world, as well as writing articles for a number of websites.

== Early life ==
He was born in Lebanon, and there he studied and grew up. He got into poetry while majoring in journalism. He moved at some point to blogging and writing in coinciding with his work in public information and electronic marketing. Assad founded his blog "Beiruti Scribbles", which was nominated by a German magazine for the best Arab blog of the year 2010. When Assad was young he dreamed of being a pilot and then an army officer, but his conditions then led him to media school.

== Career ==
Assad Thebian participated in "74" by directors Rania and Raed Rafei, then produced and starred in several short films. He entered into the world of writing and publishing early and first released a poetry "The greatest amusement" (Arabic title: Al-Lahoo Al-Akbar). He won the "Arabnet" Award for best marketing idea of the year 2013. In August 2015, Assad Thebian was considered to be one of the most important activists organizing the civil campaign "#Tel’at Rehatkoum".

In 2015, Assad Thebian emerged as a youth of the civic movement and soon became a prominent activist in the "Tel’at Rehatkoum".Assad –who's part of the movement- started talking about topics of interest to children, and looted money. He also organized rallies and demonstrations at which he and others tried to invite youth to continue to demonstrate.

== Opinions ==
Assad Thebian, one of the "Tel’at Rehatkoum" – No political event can be separated from its past, and everyone who has been active since the beginning of the movement has been active before, he also finds that the heavy descent into the streets was often the result of feeling defeat less against the existing system. Assad and others led bold and creative movements despite all of the group's organizational problems. He supports people's self-expression in the way they want it.

He sees that Lebanon's activists lack a single identity, due to their multiple groups and that creates a negative impact, especially when making decisions.

He also considered that the confrontation with the government highlights its stupidity, especially in the violence that has been used against demonstrators(shooting on 22 August 2016). However, he does not deny that the government has been smarter than the movement many times before. Thebian has been accused in a number of charges, including abusing the Christian religion and accusing the movement he leads of covering up members of the Islamic State (ISIS).

Thebian said the reason behind the names of his book:( “The greatest amusement” (Arabic title: Al-Lahoo Al-Akbar) is a book with philosophical poems about time and space and about longing to be free from them, and from the restrictions imposed by society, language and time. “As for where?” (Arabic title: Ama Ayn) are poems written in many countries, including Beirut, Istanbul, Cairo, Stockholm, Tunisia, Paris, among others. While the “when?” (Arabic title: Mata) it’s for four years. In Assad's view, when millions of Arabs came out to cheer on "Allah Akbar" for the liberation of the homeland, the regimes, politics and very few of them were interested in freeing themselves from the cult of family, religion, ideology, society and tribe and that was the main reason for his naming. Thebian asserts that writing is an expression of what is in the mind, it's not a purpose, but a means. He also emphasizes that he does not write to publish books or become a writer or poet, but to break free from the ideas and pictures that haunt him.

== Works ==
This is a list of the most notable works of Lebanese writer, journalist and activist Assad Thebian.

- "The greatest amusement" (Arabic title: Al-Lahoo Al-Akbar).
- "Al-Hutay’a, Aws bin Jarwal Al-Absi".
- "you choose the title" (Arabic title: iktari Anty Al-Inwan).
